ʻAbd al-Ḥafīẓ (ALA-LC romanization of ) is a Muslim male given name, and in modern usage, surname. It is built from the Arabic words ʻabd and al-Ḥafīẓ, one of the names of God in the Qur'an, which give rise to the Muslim theophoric names. It means "servant of the Guardian" or “servant of the preserver”.

It may refer to:
Abdul Hafeez, known as Senior Brigadier General  of Pakistan ( 1954 ) Pakistani Social Activist
Abdul Hafiz Mohamed Barakatullah, known as Maulavi Barkatullah (1854–1927), Indian independence activist
Abu Ahmad Abdul Hafiz (1900–1985), Bengali politician and lawyer
Abdelhafid of Morocco (1873–1937), Sultan of Morocco
Abdul Hafeez (chemist) (1882-1964), Pakistani scientist
Abdul Hafiz (VC) (1915-1944), Indian army soldier
Osman Abdel Hafeez (1917–1958), Egyptian fencer
Abdul Hafeez Kardar, or just Abdul Kardar (1925-1996), Pakistani cricketer
Abdelhafid Boussouf (1926-1980), Algerian politician
Abdul Hafiz (Lieutenant General) (born 1957), Lieutenant General of Bangladesh Army
Abdul Hafiz Mansoor (born 1963), Afghan politician
Abdelhafid Tasfaout (born 1969), Algerian footballer
Yasser Abdel Hafez (born 1969), Egyptian novelist and journalist
Sayed Abdel Hafeez (born 1977), Egyptian footballer
Abdul Hafeez (English cricketer) (born 1977)
Abdelhafid Benchabla (born 1986), Algerian boxer
Abd-al-Hafid Mahmud al-Zulaytini, Libyan politician
Abdul Hafeez Shaikh, Pakistani politician
Abdul Hafiz Pirzada, Pakistani lawyer and politician
Abdul Hafeez (al Qaeda leader), see Muhanad Mahmoud Al Farekh

References

Arabic masculine given names